Eberhard Moritz Adolph Albert Graf von Zeppelin (22 May 1842 - 30 October 1906) was a German historian, banker, hotelier, author, and ambassador of Württemberg.

Selected publications
His publications include:
 Geschichte der Dampfschifffahrt auf dem Bodensee 1824–1884: Separatabdruck aus dem 14. Hefte der „Schriften des Vereins für Geschichte des Bodensee's und seiner Umgebung“, Verlag Johann Thomas Stettner, Lindau 1885
 Der Konstanzer Vertrag Kaiser Friedrichs I. Barbarossa von 1153, Lindau 1887
 Urkunden-Regesten aus dem Gräfl. Douglas'schen Archiv zu Schloss Langenstein im Hegau, Lindau 1889–90
 Ältere und neuere Bodensee-Forschungen, mit Jakob Hörnlimann und Robert Reber, Verlag Stettner, Lindau 1893
 Bodensee-Forschungen, Verlag Stettner, Lindau 1893
 Geographische Verhältnisse des Bodensees, Verlag Stettner, Lindau 1893
 Die hydrologischen Verhältnisse des Bodensees, Verlag Stettner, Lindau 1893
 Die Schwankungen des Bodensees, mit François-Alphonse Forel, Verlag Stettner, Lindau 1893
 Die Temperatur-Verhältnisse des Bodensees, mit Francois Alphonse Forel, Verlag Stettner, Lindau 1893
 Transparenz und Farbe des Bodenseewassers, mit Francois Alphonse Forel, Verlag Stettner, Lindau 1893
 Das Bad im Bild, illustrierter Führer zur Hebung des Fremdenverkehrs in Städten, Bädern, Kurorten und Heil-Anstalten des In- und Auslandes, Verlag Weltbad, Frankfurt a. M. ca. 1912.

References 

1842 births
1906 deaths
German hoteliers
German bankers
German non-fiction writers
Zeppelin family